Nebojša Petrović (born 14 June 1960) is a Serbian football manager and former player.

His nickname is Maradona, due to his resemblance to the famous Argentine footballer.

Club career
After coming through the youth system of Red Star Belgrade, Petrović made his Yugoslav First League debut with Rijeka in 1979. He played just 24 league games in his three seasons at Kantrida, eventually moving to Yugoslav Second League side Rad in 1982. Between 1985 and 1988, Petrović spent three seasons with OFK Beograd. He subsequently joined Proleter Zrenjanin, helping them win promotion to the top flight in 1990.

Managerial career
After hanging up his boots, Petrović served as manager of numerous clubs in his homeland and abroad, including Rad (three spells), Sileks (two spells), Pobeda, and FC Yerevan.

References

External links
 
 
 

Association football forwards
Expatriate football managers in Armenia
Expatriate football managers in North Macedonia
FC Yerevan managers
FK Pobeda managers
FK Proleter Zrenjanin players
FK Rad managers
FK Rad players
FK Sileks managers
HNK Rijeka players
OFK Beograd players
Serbian expatriate football managers
Serbian expatriate sportspeople in Armenia
Serbian expatriate sportspeople in North Macedonia
Serbian football managers
Serbian footballers
Serbian SuperLiga managers
Sportspeople from Pančevo
Yugoslav First League players
Yugoslav footballers
Yugoslav Second League players
1960 births
Living people